The Municipality of Hunter's Hill is a local government area on the Lower North Shore of Sydney, in the state of New South Wales, Australia. The municipality was first proclaimed in 1861, which includes the suburbs of Hunters Hill, Woolwich, Huntleys Point, Tarban, Henley and part of Gladesville.

At , the Municipality is, by area, the smallest local government area in New South Wales and its boundaries remain mostly unaltered since its proclamation in 1861.  

A 2015 review of local government boundaries by the NSW Government Independent Pricing and Regulatory Tribunal recommended that the Municipality of Hunter's Hill merge with adjoining councils. In July 2017, the Berejiklian government decided to abandon the forced merger of the Hunter's Hill, Lane Cove and Ryde local government areas along with several other proposed forced mergers.

The Mayor of Hunters Hill since 4 December 2021 is Clr. Zac Miles.

Suburbs and localities in the local government area 
Suburbs and localities in the Municipality of Hunters Hill are:
 Gladesville (parts are located within the City of Ryde)
 Henley
 Hunters Hill
 Huntleys Cove
 Huntleys Point
 Woolwich

Heritage listings
The Municipality of Hunter's Hill has a number of heritage-listed sites, including:
 Gladesville, Manning Road: The Priory, Gladesville
 Hunters Hill, 38-40 Alexandra Street: Vienna, Hunters Hill
 Hunters Hill, 12 Crescent Street: Milthorpe, Hunters Hill
 Hunters Hill, 14 Crescent Street: Hestock
 Hunters Hill, Ferry Street: The Garibaldi
 Hunters Hill, Nelson Parade: Kellys Bush Park
 Hunters Hill, 46 Ryde Road: Marika, Hunters Hill
 Hunters Hill, 2 Yerton Avenue: The Chalet

Demographics 
At the  there were  people resident in the Hunter's Hill local government area, of these 49.9 per cent were male and 50.1 per cent were female. Aboriginal and Torres Strait Islander people made up 0.6 per cent of the population; significantly below the NSW and Australian averages of 2.9 and 2.8 per cent respectively. The median age of people in the Municipality of Hunter's Hill was 43 years; significantly higher than the national median of 38 years. Children aged 0 – 14 years made up 19.0 per cent of the population and people aged 65 years and over made up 21.6 per cent of the population. Of people in the area aged 15 years and over, 52.7 per cent were married and 9.3 per cent were either divorced or separated.

At the 2016 census, the population in the Municipality decreased by 0.12 per cent. When compared with total population growth of Australia for the same period, being 8.8 per cent, population growth in the Hunter's Hill local government area was significantly lower than the national average. The median weekly income for residents within the Municipality of Hunter's Hill was significantly higher than the national average.

Council

Current composition and election method
Hunters Hill Municipal Council is composed of seven Councillors, including the Mayor, for a fixed four-year term of office. The Mayor is directly elected while the six other Councillors are elected proportionally as two separate wards, each electing three Councillors. The most recent election was held on 4 December 2021, and the makeup of the Council is as follows:

The Council, elected in 2021, in order of election by ward, is:

See also

List of local government areas in New South Wales

References

External links
 Hunter's Hill Municipality Council website
 Moocooboola Festival - Official Hunter's Hill Council web site
 Hunters Hill Arts - Official Hunter's Hill art show web site

 
Hunter's Hill
Hunter's Hill